Scoparia parmifera is a moth in the family Crambidae. It was described by Edward Meyrick in 1909. It is endemic to New Zealand.

References

Moths described in 1909
Moths of New Zealand
Scorparia
Endemic fauna of New Zealand
Taxa named by Edward Meyrick
Endemic moths of New Zealand